Hairy Bikers is an American reality television series which aired on History Channel. The show was based on the British show of the same name and featured chef Paul Patranella, and his friend Bill Allen, following the original's format as the two traverse the United States on motorcycles. Patranella was a former chef for The White House, acting for a time as George W. Bush's personal chef.  Allen owns a  motorcycle repair shop in Texas.

In popular culture
The show was spoofed in an episode of South Park entitled "A History Channel Thanksgiving".

References

External links
 

2010s American reality television series
2011 American television series debuts
History (American TV channel) original programming
American television series based on British television series
2011 American television series endings